Bjugn is the administrative centre of the municipality of Ørland in Trøndelag county, Norway. The village is located at the end of the Bjugnfjorden.

There is a videregående school in Botngård. Fosenhallen is one of only four indoor speed skating ovals in Norway.

Name
The settlement changed its name from Botngård to Bjugn at a meeting in March 2019 and this name change went into effect in September 2019. The former name, Botngård, was the name of a farm in the area, while the new name comes from the fjord and the municipality of Bjugn. On 1 January 2020, Bjugn municipality was to be merged with Ørland municipality and it was a local wish that the old municipal name should live on after the municipal merger, so the name was changed. After the merger this village became the administrative centre of the newly enlarged municipality.

Media gallery

References

Villages in Trøndelag
Ørland